Ayer Y Hoy is Menudo's 18th album (16th in Spanish) released in 1985, featuring Charlie Massó, Roy Rosselló, Robby Rosa, Ricky Martin, and Raymond Acevedo. This is the second album that this line-up recorded together. Menudo's 19th album (second in Portuguese). This album is exactly the same as the Ayer Y Hoy album with all the songs translated into Portuguese.  The album cover has the same picture as the "Ayer Y Hoy" album, but it is not exactly the same cover. The album peaked at #19 in the Billboard's Latin Pop Albums chart.

Ayer y hoy means "yesterday and today" in Spanish.

Track listing 
Ayer Y Hoy

 Side 1. 
 La Fiesta Va Empezar - Singer: Robby Rosa
 Acércate - Singer: Charlie Massó
 Aventureros - Singer: Raymond Acevedo
 Marcelo - Singer: Robby Rosa.
 Me Siento Bien Con Mis Amigos - Singer: Ricky Martin and Raymond Acevedo.

 Side 2. 
 Viva! Bravo! - Singer: Charlie Massó
 Pañuelo Blanco Americano - Singer: Raymond Acevedo
 Soy Tuyo - Singer: Robby Rosa
 En San Juan Me Enamoré - Singer: Raymond Acevedo
 Alegra Esa Cara - Singer: Roy Rosselló

A Festa Vai Começar

 Lado 1. 
 A Festa Vai Começar - Singer: Robby Rosa
 Vem, Por Favor - Singer: Charlie Massó
 Aventureiros - Singer: Raymond Acevedo
 Marcelo - Singer: Robby Rosa
 Me Sinto Bem Com Meus Amigos - Singer: Ricky Martin

 Lado 2. 
 Viva! Bravo! - Singer: Charlie Massó
 Bandeira Sul-Americana - Singer: Raymond Acevedo
 Quero Ter Teu Amor - Singer: Robby Rosa
 Em San Juan Me Apaixonei - Singer: Raymond Acevedo
 Alegra Essa Cara - Singer: Roy Rosselló

Charts

References

Menudo (band) albums
1985 albums